The Apple A5X is a 32-bit system on a chip (SoC) designed by Apple Inc. and manufactured by Samsung. Apple used it only in the third-generation iPad. The A5X is a high-performance variant of the Apple A5. Apple claimed during their media event on March 7, 2012 that the quad-core PowerVR SGX543MP4 graphics processing unit (GPU) in the A5X is two times faster than the GPU in the A5, as the A5X GPU contains two more cores than the dual-core version GPU in the A5.

The last operating system update Apple provided for a mobile device containing an A5X (third-generation iPad cellular models) was iOS 9.3.6, which was released on July 22, 2019 as it was discontinued with the release of iOS 10 in 2016.

Design 
Apple designed the A5X chip specifically for the third-generation iPad to provide the additional graphical performance it required for its new Retina display. The A5X chip features a dual-core 45 nm ARM Cortex-A9 CPU with a clock rate of 1 GHz, and a quad-core 32 nm PowerVR SGX543MP4 GPU with a clock rate of 250 MHz. Compared to the A5, the memory interface of the A5X is twice the size. The A5X memory interface subsystem utilizes four 32 bits wide LPDDR2 memory controllers.

Unlike the Apple A4 and the A5, the A5X uses a metal heat spreader (along with thermal paste) to cover the flip chip underneath. The die takes up 162.94 mm2 of area—a 36.5% increase in area used over the 119.32 mm2 die of the S5L8940 version of the A5. The A5X does not use the package on package (PoP) method of installation to support RAM—RAM is found externally from the A5X chip.

Products featuring the Apple A5X 
 iPad (3rd generation)

See also 
 Apple silicon, the range of ARM-based SoCs designed by Apple for their products.

References 

Computer-related introductions in 2012
Apple silicon